The 2003–04 Toto Cup Artzit was the 5th time the cup was being contested as a competition for the third tier in the Israeli football league system.

The competition was won by Hapoel Ramat HaSharon, who had beaten Hapoel Acre 2–1 on penalties after 0–0 in the final.

Group stage

Group A

Group B

Knockout rounds

Semifinals

Final

See also
 2003–04 Toto Cup Al

External links
 Israel Cups 2003/04 RSSSF

Artzit
Toto Cup Artzit
Toto Cup Artzit